In enzymology, a 2-acylglycerol-3-phosphate O-acyltransferase is an enzyme that catalyzes the chemical reaction

acyl-CoA + 2-acyl-sn-glycerol 3-phosphate  CoA + 1,2-diacyl-sn-glycerol 3-phosphate

Thus, the two substrates of this enzyme are acyl-CoA and 2-acyl-sn-glycerol 3-phosphate, whereas its two products are CoA and 1,2-diacyl-sn-glycerol 3-phosphate.

This enzyme belongs to the family of transferases, specifically those acyltransferases transferring groups other than aminoacyl groups.  The systematic name of this enzyme class is acyl-CoA:2-acyl-sn-glycerol 3-phosphate O-acyltransferase. This enzyme is also called 2-acylglycerophosphate acyltransferase.  This enzyme participates in glycerophospholipid metabolism.

References

 

EC 2.3.1
Enzymes of unknown structure